Mapes is a settlement in central British Columbia, Canada. The major employment is in forestry, and the major employer is Canfor (Canadian Forest Products). Mapes is 8.2 km away from the Sinkut River community, 13.2 km from Weneez, and 19.6 km from Vanderhoof.

Notes

Populated places in the Regional District of Bulkley-Nechako